James W. Archer (September 6, 1828 – January 28, 1908) was an American soldier who received the Medal of Honor for valor during the American Civil War.

Biography
Archer served in the American Civil War in the 59th Indiana Infantry for the Union Army. He received the Medal of Honor on August 2, 1897 for his actions at the Second Battle of Corinth.

Medal of Honor citation
Citation:

Voluntarily took command of another regiment, with the consent of one or more of his seniors, who were present, rallied the command and led it in the assault.

See also

 List of American Civil War Medal of Honor recipients: A-F

References

External links

Military Times

1828 births
1908 deaths
Union Army soldiers
United States Army Medal of Honor recipients
People from Edgar County, Illinois
People of Indiana in the American Civil War
American Civil War recipients of the Medal of Honor